Gone II - But Never Too Gone! is the second album by the instrumental band, Gone. During that period, the SST Record label Greg Ginn was facing some serious debts and other problems; such as fans not being interested in non-punk bands that he was signing.

This would be the last album from the band, thanks to bandleader Greg Ginn's fingers being broken from a basketball accident.

Track listing
All tracks composed by Gone
"Jungle Law" (2:23)
"New Vengeance" (4:29)
"Unglued" (2:18)
"Turned Over Stone" (3:56)
"Drop the Hat" (0:47)
"Adams" (4:40)
"Time of Entry" (0:42)
"Left Holding Bag" (1:03)
"GTV" (3:35)
"Daisy Strut" (2:25)
"Cutoff" (0:55)
"Put It There" (2:02)
"Utility Hole" (1:58)
"Yesturday Is Teacher" (0:42)
"How Soon They Forget" (1:57)
"Cobra XVIII" (5:01)

Personnel
Gone
Greg Ginn - guitar, cover artwork
Andrew Weiss - bass
Sim Cain - drums

1986 albums
SST Records albums
Gone (band) albums